The 1951 Indiana State Sycamores football team was an American football team that represented Indiana State Teachers College—now known as Indiana State University—as a member of the Indiana Collegiate Conference (ICC) during the 1951 college football season. Led by first-year head coach Mark Dean, the Sycamores compiled an overall record of 0–6–1 with a mark of 0–3–1 in conference play, placing fifth in the ICC.

Schedule

References

Indiana State
Indiana State Sycamores football seasons
College football winless seasons
Indiana State Sycamores football